Terri Jo Austin is an American educator and politician from Indiana. Austin is a Democratic member of the Indiana House of Representatives, representing the 36th District since January 2003.

Early life 
On May 17, 1955, Austin was born in Elwood, Indiana.

Education 
In 1977, Austin earned a Bachelor of Science degree in Elementary Education from Ball State University. In 1981, Austin earned a MAE degree in Elementary Education from Ball State University. In 1996, Austin earned an Educational Administration and Supervision Certificate from Butler University.

Career 
In 1983, Austin became a teacher and Administrator at Anderson Community School Corporation in Indiana, until 2001.

On November 5, 2002 Austin won the election and became a Democratic member of Indiana House of Representatives for District 36. Austin defeated Andy Kincaid with 52.18% of the votes.

In 2003, Austin became an adjunct professor at Anderson University's School of Education.

On November 2, 2004, as an incumbent, Austin won the election and continued serving District 36. Austin defeated Ronald B. Carrell with 62.04% of the votes.
On November 7, 2006, as an incumbent, Austin won the election and continued serving District 36. Austin defeated Francie Pyburn Metzger with 63.43% of the votes. On November 4, 2008, as an incumbent, Austin won the election and continued serving District 36. Austin defeated Frank Burrows and Greg Noland with 60.73% of the votes.

On November 6, 2018, as an incumbent, Austin won the election and continued serving District 36. Austin defeated Jennifer Culp with 55.41% of the votes.

Awards 
 2004 Legislator of the Year. Presented by Indiana Chiropractors Association.
 2005 Legislator of the Year. Presented by Indiana Petroleum and Convenience Store Association.
 2006 Guardian of Small Business. Presented by National Federation of Independent Business (NFIB).
 2007 Legislator of the Year. Presented by Indiana Trial Lawyers Association.
 2014 Torchbearer Award. Presented by Indiana Commission for Women (ICW). March 5, 2014.
 2014 Athena award. Athena and Community Shining Star Awards Gala.
 2019 Guardian of Small Business Award. Presented by National Federation of Independent Business (NFIB).

Personal life 
Austin's husband is Michael Austin. They have two children. Austin and her family live in Anderson, Indiana.

References

External links
State Representative Terri Austin official Indiana State Legislature site
Terri Austin, State Representative official campaign site
 Financial information (state office) at the National Institute for Money in State Politics
 Terri Austin at ballotpedia.org
 Terri Austin at Hoosierwomenforward.org

Democratic Party members of the Indiana House of Representatives
1955 births
Living people
Politicians from Anderson, Indiana
Women state legislators in Indiana
21st-century American politicians
21st-century American women politicians
Ball State University alumni
Butler University alumni